China Township may refer to the following places in the United States:

 China Township, Lee County, Illinois
 China Township, Michigan
 East China Township, Michigan

See also
 China Township Electrification Program, a rural electrification program in several Chinese provinces